The Phophonyane Falls Nature Reserve is a scenic, 600 ha large nature reserve and tourist destination near Piggs Peak, Eswatini. 

A network of footpaths through the Gobolondlo forest reaches meandering watercourses which lead to the main attraction of the reserve - the 80 m high Phophonyane Falls. This waterfall has formed on a steep section of exposed gneiss. The Phophonyane River in this area falls per some 240 m over the distance of 2 km.

Some of the oldest rocks in the world, dated at 3.55 billion years, are exposed at the waterfall.

References

External links
Phophonyane Falls Ecolodge and Nature Reserve

Geography of Eswatini
Geology of Eswatini